is a Japanese manga series written and illustrated by Kaori Yuki. It was published in Kodansha's Aria magazine from January 2014 to April 2018, and later, after Aria ceased publication, serialized in Shōnen Magazine Edge from July to September 2018.

Plot
The series centers on Stella Kuonji, one of nine adopted siblings in the wealthy and influential Kuonji family. At one of the family's monthly tea parties, their parents announce that the children must now fight to the death within the next year, with the sole survivor being chosen as the family's heir. In the ensuing chaos, Stella's violent alternative personality, Bloody Alice, begins to resurface in Stella's clashes with the other children.

As the series progresses, Stella learns that her adopted family are actually bandersnatches, creatures that feed on human souls, and that they require the tea at the monthly tea parties to survive. Her adopted mother, Olga, was the sole survivor of one of the Kuonji family's rituals of bloodshed among its children. As a result of winning, Olga was allowed to bring back her partner. Furthermore, Stella begins to suspect that the accident that killed her parents was a plot by the Kuonji family. Although Stella and her beloved elder brother Zeno wish to end the family tradition of ritualistic bloodshed, Olga denies that possibility.

Release
Kaori Yuki began serializing the manga in Kodansha's shōjo magazine Aria on 28 January 2014. After Aria ceased publication on 28 April 2018, the series was transferred to Shonen Magazine Edge, starting publication on 17 July of the same year. The series finished on 15 September 2018.

Yen Press licensed the series for release in North America.

Volume list

Reception
Reviewing the first volume for Anime News Network, Rebecca Silverman gave it a grade of B.  She commented that the series "doesn't always work, but it has enough potential to that given another volume or two, I feel like it will really take off."  She praised the art, and wrote that Stella's mother "is definitely a leading contender for 'sickest parent in manga.'", saying that the scenes with the parents were "a combination of enraging and chilling, making them easily the most effective part of the volume."

References

External links

  at Aria 
  at Hachette Book Group (parent of Yen Press)
 

Comics based on Alice in Wonderland
Dark fantasy anime and manga
Gothic fiction
Kaori Yuki
Kodansha manga
Shōjo manga
Shōnen manga
Yen Press titles